The 1995 Pontins Professional was the twenty-second edition of the professional invitational snooker tournament which took place in May 1995 in Prestatyn, Wales.

The tournament featured eight professional players. The quarter-final matches were contested over the best of 9 frames, the semi-final matches over the best of 11 frames, and the final over the best of 17 frames.

Peter Ebdon won the event for the first time, beating Ken Doherty 9–8 in the final.

Main draw

References

Pontins Professional
Snooker competitions in Wales
Pontins Professional
Pontins Professional
Pontins Professional